The lawn bowls competition at the 1986 Commonwealth Games took place at the Balgreen Bowls Club in Edinburgh, Scotland from 24 July until 2 August 1986.

Medal table

Medallists

Results 
 The Women's pairs and Fours were inaugurated during these Games.

Men's singles – round robin

Men's pairs – round robin

Men's fours - round robin

Women's singles – round robin

Women's pairs – round robin

Women's fours - round robin

References

See also
List of Commonwealth Games medallists in lawn bowls
Lawn bowls at the Commonwealth Games

1986 Commonwealth Games events
1986
Bowls in Scotland
1986 in bowls